The members of the Parliament of Fiji from 1994 to 1999 consisted of members of the House of Representatives elected between 18 and 25 February 1994 and members of the appointed Senate.

House of Representatives

References

 1994